The Voice (German: Die Stimme) is a 1920 German silent drama film directed by Adolf Gärtner and starring Albert Bassermann, Elsa Bassermann and Loo Hardy.

The film's sets were designed by the art director Hans Dreier.

Cast
 Albert Bassermann
 Elsa Bassermann
 Loo Hardy
 Hermann Leffler
 Charlotte Schultz
 Gerhard Tandar
 Hella Thornegg

References

Bibliography
 Grange, William. Cultural Chronicle of the Weimar Republic. Scarecrow Press, 2008.

External links

1920 films
Films of the Weimar Republic
Films directed by Adolf Gärtner
German silent feature films
1920 drama films
German drama films
UFA GmbH films
German black-and-white films
Silent drama films
1920s German films
1920s German-language films